Beans Ferry (also Boatrights Ferry) is an unincorporated community in Itawamba County, Mississippi, United States. The Mississippian Railway passes through Beans Ferry.

The hamlet is located at a site on the east bank of the Tennessee–Tombigbee Waterway (formerly the Tombigbee River), where in the 1800s, Robert Beene operated a ferry.  His father, John Beene, born in 1788, helped survey the area before Itawamba County was formed, and was a member of the county's first Board of Police (elected council).

The ferry was replaced by a bridge in 1923, which was replaced by a new bridge in 1948.  That bridge lasted until the construction of the Tennessee–Tombigbee Waterway in the 1970s.

A large recreation area is located at Beans Ferry, with a boat launch, viewing area, dock, parking, and picnic 
area.

There is an active natural gas field at Beans Ferry.

Notes

Unincorporated communities in Itawamba County, Mississippi
Unincorporated communities in Mississippi